Willie Tan Ong (born October 24, 1963) is a Filipino cardiologist, internist and media personality who rose to prominence for giving medical advice through his Facebook page with large following and his YouTube channel. Ong was also a candidate for the 2019 Philippine Senate election, largely capitalizing on his social media presence. He was a candidate for vice president in the 2022 Philippine presidential election as the running mate of former mayor of Manila Isko Moreno.

Early life and education 
Ong was born in Manila on October 24, 1963. His father, Ong Yong, was an immigrant from Jinjiang, China who settled in the Philippines in 1922. Better known as Co Tec Tai (許澤台) in the Chinese Filipino community, the elder Ong was an active charity worker who served as president for various civic organizations. 

For his elementary and high school education, Ong attended Xavier School in San Juan, Metro Manila. He studied botany at the University of the Philippines Diliman and then earned his medical degree at the De La Salle Medical and Health Sciences Institute, which was then the College of Medicine of De La Salle University, in 1992.

Medical career 
Ong completed his residency in internal medicine at Manila Doctors Hospital, where he was the chief resident. He then completed his fellowship in cardiology at the Philippine General Hospital, where he was the chief fellow. He also achieved the award for the highest academic performance when he did his Masters in Public Health at the University of the Philippines Manila.

Ong has also authored books. His first publication is the Medicine Blue Book which is often used by Filipino medical students and neophyte doctors. He also wrote the Cardiology Blue Book, which is a guidebook for diagnosis and treatment of heart conditions.

He has also worked as a consultant with the Department of Health from 2010 to 2014. Ong also established the Co Tec Tai Medical Museum in Pasay, named in honor of his father and reportedly the first medical museum in the Philippines. The museum documents the history of healthcare in the Philippines.

Discography 

 Isang Pasasalamat (2019)
 Pag-Asa (2019)
 Dakilang Diyos (2019)

Television, radio and journalism 
In 2005, Ong became part of RJTV where he produced his own television show. From 2008 to 2018, he made appearances on ABS-CBN's Salamat Dok. He did not have a regular segment on the television show and only participated as a volunteer. He left Salamat Dok in October 2018 to pursue an electoral bid for the Senate in 2019. Ong also wrote for The Philippine Star and its sister publications, Pilipino Star Ngayon and PM PangMasa as a columnist.

Ong was also a resident doctor and host at DZRH's public service program Docs on Call from 2009 to 2017.

Social media presence
Ong started maintaining an online presence when he set up a YouTube channel in 2007 where he posted video health tips. According to Ong, he first started to have presence in Facebook in 2012, when mainstream media outlets posts the medical advice articles he wrote for them on the social media platform. In 2013, Ong approached an impersonator who maintained a Facebook page with at least a million followers under his name and likeness and ask them for advise on how to "get more followers". He then went on continuing to produce articles.

Political career

2019 Senate bid

Ong launched a bid to get elected as a Senator in the 2019 Philippine elections. His electoral campaign had a focus on health issues, particularly on providing a "holistic approach to providing total health care", leveraging on him being the "only doctor running for the Senate". Had he won, he would be the fifth physician to be elected in the Congress' upper house preceding Juan Nolasco (1931–1935), Jose Locsin (1954–1957), Juan Flavier (1995–2007) and Luisa Ejercito Estrada (2001–2007). Outside of health issues, Ong also expressed openness for the introduction of death penalty for heinous crimes, the lowering of the minimum age of criminal responsibility, and the adoption of federalism as the form of government for the Philippines.

Running on the banner of the Lakas–CMD political party, Ong said he did not rely on campaign donations to "avoid being indebted to anyone". Instead he relied on his online presence on Facebook and YouTube where he has 9.7 million followers and 1 million subscribers respectively as of March 2019. His campaign was also backed by 23 other pages with over 800 thousand followers and 28 groups with about 87.6 thousand members in Facebook. According to Ong's wife, some of these presence were managed by Overseas Filipino Workers (OFWs) who volunteered to support Willie Ong's campaign. Ong was also backed by other social media pages which supported other candidates backed by President Rodrigo Duterte's administration such as Imee Marcos and Bong Go.

Ong also supported the Anakalusugan Party-list's election bid, by featuring for two seconds in an advertisement supporting the organization.

He failed to win one of the 12 contested seats in the Senate finishing 18th in the polls with 7.5 million votes. Counting only votes by OFWs, Ong ranked second behind Bato dela Rosa.

2022 vice presidential campaign

On September 21, 2021, it was announced that he will run for vice president in 2022 as the running mate of Manila mayor Isko Moreno. Ong left Lakas–CMD a day later after his announcement to run for vice president. He joined Moreno's political party, Aksyon Demokratiko, on September 25. On May 9, 2022, Ong lost in his bid to Sara Duterte placing fourth out of nine candidates. Ong conceded to Duterte on May 11.

Personal life 
Ong is married to Anna Liza Ramoso, who is also a physician. They first met each other in 1992 while Ong was working as an intern at San Juan De Dios Hospital and got married a year later. They have two daughters.

References

External links 

Living people
University of the Philippines Diliman alumni
Filipino medical doctors
Tagalog people
1963 births
Filipino YouTubers
Filipino Roman Catholics
Filipino columnists
Filipino medical writers
Filipino cardiologists
People from Manila
Filipino politicians of Chinese descent
Candidates in the 2022 Philippine vice-presidential election
Aksyon Demokratiko politicians